Blue alert may refer to:

Blue Alert (album), a 2006 album by singer Anjani 
"Blue Alert" (song), from the 2012 Sylvia Brooks album Restless
National Blue Alert Act of 2013, a proposed Act of Congress
Blue alert, a public notification system in the United States; see Silver Alert